Daniel B. McFall (born April 8, 1963 in Kenmore, New York and raised in Buffalo, New York) is an American retired professional ice hockey player who played nine games in the National Hockey League between 1985 and 1986 with the Winnipeg Jets. He now runs a hockey company in Burlington, Vermont that organizes various leagues, clinics, and tournaments.

Career statistics

Regular season and playoffs

International

Awards and honors

References

External links
 

1963 births
Living people
American men's ice hockey defensemen
Fort Wayne Komets players
Ice hockey people from Buffalo, New York
Michigan State Spartans men's ice hockey players
People from Kenmore, New York
Sherbrooke Canadiens players
Winnipeg Jets (1979–1996) draft picks
Winnipeg Jets (1979–1996) players
AHCA Division I men's ice hockey All-Americans
Ice hockey people from New York (state)